Balocco S.p.A. is an Italian food company based in Fossano. It was founded in 1927.

Balocco produces a range of biscuits. The company exports products to about 30 countries and offers private-label production services.

History 
The company was founded in the small town of Fossano (about 70km south of Turin) first as a pastry shop by Francesco Antonio Balocco.

From 1948, Balocco began to produce panettoni, pandori, colombe pasquali, biscuits and  wafers.

Balocco began to industrially produce confectionery from 1970.

During the 1990s, the company was taken over by Aldo Balocco's sons, Alessandra and Alberto.

On June 2, 2010, Italian President Giorgio Napolitano named Aldo Balocco Knight of the “Order of Labor Merit”.

On July 2, 2022 in Milan, the son of the founder, Mr. Aldo Balocco, Honorary President of Balocco spa, died at the age of 91 

The founder's grandson Alberto Balocco died at the age of 56 on 26 August 2022, struck by lightning together with a friend during a mountain bike trip a few kilometers from the Sestriere hill.

References

External links 
 Company website

Food and drink companies established in 1927
Italian brands
Italian companies established in 1927
Confectionery companies of Italy